New Jersey's 15th Legislative District is one of 40 in the New Jersey Legislature, covering the Hunterdon County municipalities of East Amwell Township, Lambertville City and West Amwell Township; and the Mercer County municipalities of Ewing Township, Hopewell Borough, Hopewell Township, Lawrence Township, Pennington Borough, Trenton City and West Windsor Township.

Demographic characteristics
As of the 2020 United States census, the district had a population of 224,002, of whom 174,477 (77.9%) were of voting age. The racial makeup of the district was 86,762 (38.7%) White, 57,461 (25.7%) African American, 1,700 (0.8%) Native American, 26,345 (11.8%) Asian, 139 (0.1%) Pacific Islander, 32,929 (14.7%) from some other race, and 18,666 (8.3%) from two or more races. Hispanic or Latino of any race were 53,100 (23.7%) of the population.

The district had 149,156 registered voters as of December 1, 2021, of whom 53,472 (35.8%) were registered as unaffiliated, 73,283 (49.1%) were registered as Democrats, 20,031 (13.4%) were registered as Republicans, and 2,370 (1.6%) were registered to other parties.

The district includes New Jersey's capital, Trenton and a number of its comparatively wealthier suburbs to the north. The district has the smallest population of any district in the state, and has a comparatively higher percentage of African-American residents and a notable percentage of children in the Temporary Assistance for Needy Families program. Registered Democrats outnumber Republicans by an almost 3 to 1 margin.

Political representation
The district is represented for the 2020–2021 Legislative Session (Senate, General Assembly) in the State Senate by Shirley Turner (D, Lawrence Township) and in the General Assembly by Verlina Reynolds-Jackson (D, Trenton) and Anthony Verrelli (D, Hopewell Township).

It overlaps with New Jersey's 7th and 12th congressional districts.

1967–1973
In the interim period after the 1964 Supreme Court decision Reynolds v. Sims which required the creation of state legislature districts to be made as equal in population as possible and the 1973 creation of the 40-district map, the 15th District was based in the rural northwestern counties of the state. In the 1967 and 1969 elections, the district consisted of all of Hunterdon, Warren, and Sussex counties which sent one senator and two Assembly members to the legislature, elected at-large. For the 1971 election, the district was made up of only Warren and Sussex counties, again electing one senator and two Assembly members. Republican Wayne Dumont won both Senate elections for the 15th District in this period. In the Assembly elections, Republican Robert Littell won one seat in each of the three Assembly elections in the 15th District. Incumbent Republican assemblyman from Hunterdon County Douglas E. Gimson won re-election to the Assembly in 1967 from this district but died on May 15, 1969. Republicans chose Walter E. Foran to be the other Republican candidate in 1969's general election resulting in a lawsuit from third-place finisher Walter C. Keogh-Dwyer. Foran was elected to the other seat in 1969 and served one term until his home county was moved to the 6th District in 1971. Keogh-Dwyer sought election to the Assembly again in 1971 but was successful in this election.

Election history since 1973
In the 40-district legislative map created in 1973, the 15th District consisted of all of Warren and Sussex counties and West Milford and Ringwood in Passaic County. With the exception of the district electing one Democrat to the Assembly in the 1973 general election, the district had been solidly Republican until 1982. When redistricting following the 1980 United States Census shifted the district to the Trenton area, the 15th District became a strongly Democratic district. The new 15th District consisted of Trenton, Ewing, Lawrence Township, West Windsor, Princeton Township and Princeton Borough. The 1981 elections brought in Democrats Gerald R. Stockman in the Senate, along with Gerard S. Naples and John S. Watson in the Assembly. The trio remained together in office for a decade.

No changes were made to the district boundaries following the 1990 Census and 1991 redistricting. New Jersey Lottery television host Dick LaRossa ran as a Republican in 1991, having registered with the party only five days before that year's filing deadline. He defeated incumbent Gerald R. Stockman by a narrow 50.9%-49.1% margin. His Republican running mate John W. Hartmann knocked off Naples, while Democrat Watson was narrowly re-elected to a sixth term in office. Hartmann, a 24-year-old student at the Seton Hall University School of Law, became the youngest Republican ever elected to the Assembly.

In the 1993 elections, Democrats sought to recoup their losses suffered in the 1991 Republican landslide. In the Assembly, Shirley Turner and Joseph Yuhas ran for office, winning back Hartmann's seat from the Republicans. LaRossa faced Stockman for a second time in 1993, with the incumbent receiving endorsements from the AFL-CIO, locals of the Communication Workers of America and the New Jersey State Patrolmen's Benevolent Association. LaRossa won re-election despite the challenge. Yuhas stepped down after a single term in office and was replaced on the ballot in 1995 by Reed Gusciora. In the next election, Turner defeated LaRossa in the Senate election while Bonnie Watson Coleman replaced her in the Assembly.

Following the 2000 Census and the 2001 legislative redistricting, West Windsor was shifted to the 14th District but added were Hopewell Township and its two enclave boroughs, Pennington and Hopewell. This addition led to longtime Republican legislator and Pennington resident William E. Schluter to retire from the state senate and run as an independent in the gubernatorial election that year. For the entire decade, Turner, Gusciora, and Watson Coleman were all reelected to their seats. In the 2011 redistricting, the 15th regained West Windsor and picked up East Amwell, West Amwell, and Lambertville in Hunterdon County, but lost the Princetons to the Republican-leaning 16th District. Gusciora, then a Princeton Township resident, moved to a house in Trenton to continue representing the district. The trio were elected twice more but Watson Coleman was elected to Congress in 2014. To replace Watson Coleman, Mercer and Hunterdon County Democrats chose Mercer County Democratic Party Chair and former Freeholder Elizabeth Maher Muoio.

Muoio was nominated by Governor Phil Murphy to serve as the Treasurer of New Jersey. She resigned from office effective January 15, 2018, as well as from her position as director of economic development for Mercer County in order to begin work in the executive branch, in advance of her April 12 confirmation by the New Jersey Senate; her resignation came less than a week after being sworn into office for her second full term in the Assembly. Trenton Councilwoman and Mercer County Democratic Committee chair Verlina Reynolds-Jackson was chosen at a February 10 convention on the second ballot from a field of three candidates to succeed Muoio until a November 2018 special election, and was sworn in on February 15.

Gusciora was elected Mayor of Trenton on June 12, 2018. Prior to being sworn in, he resigned from the Assembly on June 30. Mercer County Freeholder Anthony Verrelli, who finished runner-up to Reynolds-Jackson at the previous convention, was chosen at a special convention held on July 26 on the second ballot from a field of four candidates to fill Gusciora's seat; he was sworn in on August 6. Both Reynolds-Jackson and Verrelli will compete in a November 2018 special election to complete the unexpired terms.

Election History

Election results, 1973–present

Senate

General Assembly

Election results, 1967–1973

Senate

General Assembly

References

Hunterdon County, New Jersey
Mercer County, New Jersey
15